Mirza Askari (1635 — 12 May 1710), better known by his title Wazir Khan, was the Mughal governor of Sirhind in the present state of Punjab. He administered the territory of the Mughal Empire that laid between the Sutlej and Yamuna rivers.

Mirza Askari (Wazir Khan) was a native of Kunjpura in Karnal district of modern day Haryana, according to Sikh sources.

Wazir Khan is noted for his conflicts with the Sikhs and became infamous for ordering the execution of Guru Gobind Singh's young sons (Sahibzada Fateh Singh and Sahibzada Zorawar Singh) in 1704. He was the governor of Sirhind when he arrested the two younger sons of Guru Gobind Singh. Wazir Khan tried to force the young sons of the Guru to embrace Islam. When they refused to accept Islam he ordered them to bricked alive. 

Wazir Khan was defeated and beheaded by a Sikh named Fateh Singh, a warrior in the Sikh Khalsa, during the Battle of Chappar Chiri on 12 May 1710.
Mughal nobility
Mughal Subahdars
Mughal generals
1635 births

References 

Mughal Empire people
Year of birth missing
1710 deaths
People executed by decapitation
18th-century executions in India
18th-century Indian Muslims
People from Fatehgarh Sahib district